Cosio Valtellino is a comune (municipality) in the Province of Sondrio in the Italian region Lombardy, located about  northeast of Milan and about  west of Sondrio.

Cosio Valtellino borders the following municipalities: Bema, Cercino, Mantello, Morbegno, Rasura, Rogolo, Traona.

The principal seat of Galbusera (confectionery company) resides in Cosio.

References

Cities and towns in Lombardy